VP-03 (also referred to in some sources as PF04) was a sub-orbital spaceflight of the SpaceShipTwo-class VSS Unity which took place on 13 December 2018, piloted by Mark P. Stucky and co-piloted by Frederick W. "CJ" Sturckow.

VSS Unity was carried aloft by the White Knight Two carrier plane before being released. The flight was operated by Virgin Galactic, a private company led by Richard Branson who conducted a space tourism flight on 11 July 2021. It was the first crewed spaceflight from U.S. soil since the Space Shuttle mission STS-135 in 2011.

Crew

Flights are currently only by U.S Convention.

Background
During the 20th century, human spaceflight was conducted exclusively by countries and government agencies, such as NASA.  This began to change during the early 21st century, as several private spaceflight companies either continued development, or were established.  From 2000-2004, Blue Origin, SpaceX and Virgin Galactic were founded.  In 2004, SpaceShipOne became the first private craft to carry humans into space.  On three separate one-man sub-orbital flights, pilots Mike Melvill and Brian Binnie reached a maximum altitude above 100 kilometers, thereby crossing the Kármán line, the internationally recognized boundary of outer space.  SpaceShipOne was carried into flight in a parasite configuration by White Knight, its mother ship, from which point it flew into space.  SpaceShipOne was designed by Burt Rutan and manufactured by Scaled Composites, a company he had founded in 1982.  In 2005, Rutan and Virgin Galactic founder Richard Branson co-founded The Spaceship Company, a separate manufacturing organization meant to supply Virgin Galactic with a fleet of spacecraft.  The results were SpaceShipTwo and mother ship White Knight Two, also designed by Rutan.  The first instances of each craft were dubbed the [[VSS Enterprise|VSS Enterprise]] and the VMS Eve, respectively.  The parasite aspect of both SpaceShipOne and SpaceShipTwo's flight profiles are shared with the North American X-15, an earlier spaceplane which also performed high-altitude and sub-orbital flights.

In May 2013, retired NASA astronaut and four-time Space Shuttle veteran Frederick "CJ" Sturckow joined Virgin Galactic as a test pilot.  Sturckow had previously flown on STS-88, STS-105, STS-117 and STS-128 before entering spaceflight's private sector.

On 31 October 2014, the Enterprise was destroyed in a catastrophic breakup, killing its co-pilot Michael Alsbury and seriously injuring its lead pilot Peter Siebold.  Following the disaster, the second SpaceShipTwo craft, VSS Unity, was completed in 2016, and began testing.

In January 2015, Scaled Composites test pilot Mark "Forger" Stucky was hired by Virgin Galactic as a test pilot.  Stucky had been closely involved with the development of SpaceShipTwo during his tenure with Scaled.  He also served for one year (2014-2015) as the president of the Society of Experimental Test Pilots.

Flight
Both craft landed safely afterwards. The flight was publicized online in various tweets by Virgin Galactic, Branson himself, and related personnel.

Response
The Federal Aviation Administration congratulated Virgin Galactic and the pilots on their successful flight, and invited the team to Washington, D.C. for a ceremony to award the pilots astronaut wings.

Virgin Galactic and its personnel were also congratulated on Twitter by U.S Vice President Mike Pence, NASA administrator Jim Bridenstine, Canadian astronaut Chris Hadfield, and British astronaut Tim Peake. On the other hand, Virgin Galactic were sharply criticized following the flight by Australian-American astronaut Andy Thomas, who characterized their sub-orbital program as "a high-altitude aeroplane flight and a dangerous one at that".

See also

 Mercury-Redstone 3
 Mercury-Redstone 4
 North American X-15
 Soyuz MS-10
 Sub-orbital spaceflight

Notes

References

2018 in California
2018 in spaceflight
2018 in aviation
SpaceShipTwo
Test spaceflights
Aviation history of the United States
History of the Mojave Desert region
Mojave Air and Space Port
Suborbital human spaceflights
December 2018 events in the United States